A by-election in Beckenham, England, was called in 1997 when the sitting Member of Parliament, Piers Merchant (Conservative), resigned from Parliament on 21 October 1997. The Conservatives held the seat, with Jacqui Lait winning the by-election on 20 November.

Background
Piers Merchant had been under pressure during the May 1997 general election after tabloid newspaper stories about his relationship with a bar hostess whom he had employed as a researcher, but he had denied any impropriety, and retained the confidence of his local association. His resignation on 21 October was caused by further newspaper stories and video footage which confirmed that his denial had been misleading. He accepted the office of Crown Steward and Bailiff of the Manor of Northstead.

At the by-election, the Conservatives selected Jacqui Lait, who had lost her seat at Hastings in the general election. The Labour candidate, Robert (Bob) Hughes, was a long time resident of the constituency and had contested the seat at the general election. The Liberal Democrats also chose their general election candidate, Rosemary Vetterlein. The Conservatives were successful in retaining the seat with a further reduced majority.

Also held on the same day was a by-election at Winchester. This was the last election (general or by-election) that the Referendum Party contested; it wound up soon afterwards.

Results

References

External links
British Parliamentary By Elections:  Campaign literature from the by-election

Beckenham,1997
Beckenham by-election
Beckenham by-election
Beckenham,1997
Beckenham by-election